U.S. Highway 385 (US 385), also known as the High Plains Highway north of Cheyenne Wells, is the easternmost significant north–south state highway in the U.S. state of Colorado. It enters the state from Oklahoma while overlapped with US 287, but splits at Lamar to follow its own route through the Eastern Plains to Nebraska.

Route description

US 385 is almost entirely a rural two-lane route. It begins at the Oklahoma state line on an overlap with US 287 (and at the west end of Oklahoma State Highway 3) and follows US 287 north through Campo and Springfield to Lamar. In that city it turns east with US 50 through Carlton to Granada, where the route turns north and finally separates from others. Communities along the route include Bristol, Sheridan Lake, Cheyenne Wells, Burlington, Wray, Holyoke, and Julesburg. US 385 turns west with US 138 in Julesburg, splitting west of the city and running northwest to the Nebraska state line.

History
The corridor along the eastern tier of Colorado was defined as several secondary highways in the 1910s. By 1914, the following were present: Secondary Road No. 2S from Oklahoma north to Holly, No. 9S from Cheyenne Wells north to Burlington, and No. 6S from Burlington north to Wray. No. 24S from Wray north to Julesburg and No. 25S south from Granada were added by 1916, and by 1919 the corridor had been completed with the extension of No. 9S south to near Granada and the connection of No. 25S to No. 2S via No. 33S east of Two Buttes. As part of a renumbering in 1923, State Highway 51 (SH 51) was assigned to the route, with one major difference: SH 51 did not follow No. 2S (which mostly became SH 89), but instead went southeast from Two Buttes to Stonington and continued by replacing No. 30S (Dallas-Canadian-Denver Highway) to the Kansas state line in the direction of Guymon, Oklahoma. (The connection in Kansas would become K-51 several years later, but the rest of the road to US 64 west of Guymon did not become Oklahoma State Highway 95 until 1953–1954.)

In 1932–1934 a short extension from Julesburg north to Nebraska (mostly via present SH 11) was added to the route, taking it from border to border. At the same time, a new State Highway 166 (SH 166) was created, paralleling the Union Pacific Railroad's Overland Route from US 138 west of Julesburg northwesterly to the Nebraska line (where it connected with Nebraska Highway 27). SH 51 spent its early days as an unpaved road, except from Granada north to Road KK near Bristol, which received "oil process surfacing" in 1931–1932 when it was still part of US 50. Otherwise, paving was begun in 1941–1942 between Holyoke and Julesburg, and was completed north of Cheyenne Wells in 1957–1958. Several major realignments were made prior to paving. US 385 was realigned north of Wray in 1937–1939, leaving behind two separate sections of County Road FF and Roads 43 and 10 returning to current US 385 south of Holyoke. Soon thereafter, in 1939–1940, US 395 was realigned to bypass Idalia and Vernon to the east, leaving behind Road 9 to Idalia (now part of US 36), Roads DD and CC between Idalia and Vernon, and Road 26 back east to current US 385. In 1953 the state got rid of a large number of state highways, including the short extension of SH 51 north of Julesburg (still unpaved), all of SH 166 (also unpaved), and the entire length of SH 51 south of Granada.

US 385 was created nationally in 1958–1959. In Colorado it followed US 287 from Oklahoma to Kit Carson, US 40 east to Cheyenne Wells, SH 51 to Julesburg, and former SH 166 (paved in 1959–1960) was returned to the state highway system for the final bit into Nebraska. The remaining independent section of SH 51 was paved over the next few years and completed in 1963–1964, at which time US 385 was moved off US 287 north of Lamar. SH 51 was dropped along with other redundant state highway designations in late 1968.

In the Eastern Colorado Mobility Study (2002) the Colorado Department of Transportation (CDOT) identified US 385 as a potential connection between the Ports-to-Plains Corridor (US 287) and Heartland Expressway (SH 71 and US 385 in Nebraska). In 2004 the Colorado General Assembly defined the High Plains Highway as that part of US 385 from Cheyenne Wells north to Nebraska, along with US 40 connecting US 287 near Kit Carson with Cheyenne Wells. A more detailed study, made in 2007, recommended improving the highway to a "super 2" facility with improved roadway geometry and shoulders. Signs marking the High Plains Highway were posted in 2009.

Major intersections

See also

References

External links

US 385 at Colorado Highways

3 Colorado
85-3
Transportation in Baca County, Colorado
Transportation in Prowers County, Colorado
Transportation in Kiowa County, Colorado
Transportation in Cheyenne County, Colorado
Transportation in Kit Carson County, Colorado
Transportation in Yuma County, Colorado
Transportation in Phillips County, Colorado
Transportation in Sedgwick County, Colorado